Bernardin Schellenberger (born 11 February 1944) is a German Catholic theologian, priest and former Trappist. He has worked as a writer and translator, focused on spiritual topics and the monastic tradition.

Life 
Bernd Schellenberger was born in Ellwangen, and grew up in Stuttgart. He then became a novice at the Franciscan , taking the monastic name Bernardin. He studied philosophy at the Hochschule der Bayerischen Franziskaner in Munich from 1964 to 1966, when he moved to Mariawald Abbey, a monastery of Trappists in Heimbach. He continued theology studies at the University of Salzburg in 1969/70 and at the University of Freiburg from 1969 to 1972, graduating with the Diplom.

Schellenberger was consecrated as a priest in 1972. In 1975, he became prior  of Mariawald. He published books and translated from 1978, first translating Henri Nouwen's The Genesee Diary – Report from a Trappist Monastery. He translated more works by Nouwen, Richard Rohr and many other American, French and Irish authors, with topics such as Zen meditation, Jewish mysticism, Church history, dealing with illness, improving health, family affairs, enneagram and social criticism.

In 1981, Schellenberger and two other friars left Mariawald and tried a community in an empty parish house in Donzdorf, but failed. He lived in the Abbey of the Genesee in Genesee County, New York from 1982, returning to Donzdorf in 1983, where he lived as a freelance  writer. Beginning in 1988, he has lived and worked at times in Togo, helping Africans. In 1991, he married a woman with two children, for whom he cared. They separated in 1998. He has lived in Bad Tölz from 2006.

Publications 
Works by Schellenberger are held by the German National Library, including:

Translator

Author

Collaboration 
 with Max Taucher: Krypten, Ursprung der Hoffnung. Echter, Würzburg 1985
 with Ines Baumgarth: Treppen, Stufen des Lebens. Echter, Würzburg 1989
 with : Glaubens A und O. Patmos, Düsseldorf 1995
 with Albus: Der Zauber des Alltäglichen. Kreuz, Stuttgart 2001
 with Albus: Worte aus der Wüste. Kreuz, Stuttgart 2003
Gespräche mit Prof. K.-J. Kuschel über den Sinn von Weihnachten, Ostern und Pfingsten. Echter, Würzburg 2004
 with D. Weber,  and : Feuerwerke – Gebete am Himmel: Lebensfragen und Einsichten. (texts of a radio series of Hessischer Rundfunk 2004). Echter, Würzburg 2005
 with : Ein Lied, das froh im Herzen jubelt. Texte der spirituellen Erfahrung der frühen Zisterzienser. Be&Be, Heiligenkreuz im Wienerwald 2010

Hymn 
Schellenberger wrote the text of the hymn "Selig, wem Christus auf dem Weg begegnet" (Blessed who is met by Christ on the way), which was included in the 2013 German Catholic hymnal Gotteslob, coupled with a 17th-century melody from Paris.

References

Further reading

External links 
 
 

20th-century German philosophers
20th-century German non-fiction writers
21st-century German non-fiction writers
Trappists
20th-century German translators
21st-century German translators
University of Salzburg alumni
University of Freiburg alumni
1944 births
Living people